Grigore V. Scafaru (born 1905, date of death unknown) was a Romanian politician from Bessarabia.

Biography 
Scafaru was born in Ciuciuleni. He served as mayor of Ciuciuleni and member of the Parliament of Romania. After the Soviet occupation of Bessarabia and Northern Bukovina, Grigore Scafaru was deported to Sverdlovsk. He was the father of Valentina Scafaru-Sturza, the chairwoman of the Association of former deportees and political detainees 
().

Awards 
Scafaru was awarded the "Crucea de Aur" by Carol II of Romania.

References

External links 
 Grigore Scafaru
 „Istoria dacă n-o cunoaştem nici prezentul nu-i la locul lui”

1905 births
Year of death missing
People from Hîncești District
Mayors of places in Moldova
National Liberal Party (Romania) politicians
Romanian anti-communists
Romanian activists
Romanian farmers